Michael George Wilson (born February 23, 2000) is an American football wide receiver for the Stanford Cardinal.

Early life and high school
Wilson grew up in Simi Valley, California and attended Chaminade College Preparatory School. As a junior, he caught 70 passes for 1,278 yards and 12 touchdowns. Wilson was rated a four-star recruit and committed to play college football at Stanford after considering Notre Dame.

College career
Wilson played in all 13 of Stanford's games during his freshman season. He became a starter as a sophomore and led the Cardinal with 56 receptions and 672 receiving yards while scoring 5 touchdowns. Wilson caught 19 passes for 261 yards and one touchdown in the first four games of his junior season before suffering a foot injury. Wilson missed the beginning of his senior year due to the foot injury that he suffered in the previous season. He returned for the final four games and had 19 receptions for 185 yards. Wilson used the extra year of eligibility granted to college athletes in 2020 due to the COVID-19 pandemic and returned to Stanford for a fifth season. He caught 26 passes 418 yards and four touchdowns in six games before suffering a season-ending injury.

References

External links
Stanford Cardinal bio

Living people
Players of American football from California
American football wide receivers
Stanford Cardinal football players
Year of birth missing (living people)